

Racing record

Complete FIA European Rallycross Championship results
(key)

Supercar

Complete FIA World Rallycross Championship results
(key)

Supercar

† Points scored with other team(s).

References

External links
 
 

British auto racing teams
World Rallycross Championship teams
Auto racing teams established in 2013